The Indonesian Hockey Association is the governing body of field hockey in Indonesia. It is affiliated to IHF International Hockey Federation and AHF Asian Hockey Federation. The headquarters of the federation are in Jakarta.

Brig. Gen. Yus Adi Kamrullah is the President of the Indonesian Hockey Association and Mrs. Masturoh is the General Secretary.

See also
 Indonesia men's national field hockey team
 Indonesia women's national field hockey team

References

External links
 Indonesian Hockey Association

Indonesia
Hockey
Field hockey in Indonesia